Barksdale is an unincorporated community in Summers County, West Virginia, United States. Barksdale is located on the New River and West Virginia Route 20, north of Hinton.

References

Unincorporated communities in Summers County, West Virginia
Unincorporated communities in West Virginia